Anne Bonny (8 March 1697 – disappeared April 1721), sometimes Anne Bonney, was an Irish pirate operating in the Caribbean, and one of the few female pirates in recorded history. What little that is known of her life comes largely from Captain Charles Johnson's 1724 book A General History of the Pyrates.

Bonny was born in Ireland around 1700 and moved to London and then to the Province of Carolina when she was about 10 years old. Around 1718 she married sailor James Bonny, assumed his last name, and moved with him to Nassau in the Bahamas, a sanctuary for pirates. It was there that she met Calico Jack Rackham and became his pirate partner and lover. She was captured alongside Rackham and Mary Read in October 1720. All three were sentenced to death, but Bonny and Read had their executions stayed because both of them were pregnant. Read died of a fever in jail in April 1721 (likely due to complications from the pregnancy), but Bonny's fate is unknown.

Early life 
Bonny's birthdate is speculated to be around 1700. She was said to be born in Old Head of Kinsale, in County Cork, Ireland. She was the daughter of servant woman Mary Brennan and Brennan's employer, lawyer William Cormac. She was born to Mary Brennan because following the illness of Cormac's wife she was moved down to her mother-in-law's home which was a few miles down the road. While the wife of William Cormac was ill and at another home, William stayed to look over the family home where he then had an affair with one of the maids, Mary Brennan, who then birthed Anne Bonny. Anne Bonny was seen as one of the legitimate issues from William Cormac. Official records and contemporary letters dealing with her life are scarce, and most modern knowledge stems from Charles Johnson's A General History of the Pyrates (a collection of pirate biographies, the first edition partly accurate, the second much embellished).

Bonny's father William Cormac first moved to London to get away from his wife's family, and he began dressing Anne as a boy and calling her "Andy". When Cormac's wife discovered William had taken in his illegitimate daughter and was bringing the child up to be a lawyer's clerk and dressing her as a boy, she stopped giving him an allowance. Cormac then moved to the Province of Carolina, taking along Anne and her mother, his former serving girl. Bonny's father abandoned the original "Mc" prefix of their family name to blend more easily into the Charles Town citizenry. At first, the family had a rough start in their new home, but Cormac's knowledge of the law and ability to buy and sell goods soon financed a townhouse and eventually a plantation just out of town. Bonny's mother died when she was 12. Her father attempted to establish himself as an attorney but did not do well. Eventually, he joined the more profitable merchant business and accumulated a substantial fortune.

It is recorded that Bonny had red hair and was considered a "good catch" but may have had a fiery temper; at age 13, she supposedly stabbed a servant girl with a knife. She married a poor sailor and small-time pirate named James Bonny. James hoped to win possession of his father-in-law's estate, but Bonny was disowned by her father. Anne's father did not approve of James Bonny as a husband for his daughter, and he kicked Anne out of their house. 

There is a story that Bonny set fire to her father's plantation in retaliation, but no evidence exists in support. However, it is known that sometime between 1714 and 1718, she and James Bonny moved to Nassau, on New Providence Island, known as a sanctuary for English pirates called the Republic of Pirates. Many inhabitants received a King's Pardon or otherwise evaded the law. It is also recorded that, after the arrival of Governor Woodes Rogers in the summer of 1718, James Bonny became an informant for the governor. James Bonny would report to Governor Rogers about the pirates in the area, which resulted in a multitude of these pirates being arrested. Anne disliked the work her husband did for Governor Rogers.

Rackham's partner

While in the Bahamas, Bonny began mingling with pirates in the taverns. She met John "Calico Jack" Rackham, and he became her lover. Rackham subsequently offered money to her husband James if he would divorce her, but her husband refused and threatened to beat Rackham. She and Rackham escaped the island together, and she became a member of his crew.
She disguised herself as a man on the ship, and only Rackham and Mary Read were aware that she was a woman until it became clear that she was pregnant. Rackham then landed her in Cuba where she gave birth to a son. She then rejoined Rackham and continued the pirate life, having divorced her husband and married Rackham while at sea. Bonny, Rackham, and Read stole the ship William, then at anchor in Nassau harbor, and put out to sea. Rackham and the two women recruited a new crew. Their crew spent years in Jamaica and the surrounding area. Bonny took part in combat alongside the men, and Governor Rogers named her in a "Wanted Pirates" circular published in The Boston News-Letter.

When Bonny told Read that she was a woman because she was attracted to her, Read revealed that she too was a woman. To abate the jealousy of Rackham, who suspected romantic involvement between the two, Bonny told him that Read was a woman. Speculation over the relationship between Bonny and Read led to images depicting the two in battle together.

A victim of the pirates, Dorothy Thomas, left a description of Read and Bonny: They "wore men's jackets, and long trousers, and handkerchiefs tied about their heads: and ... each of them had a machete and pistol in their hands and they cursed and swore at the men to murder her [Dorothy Thomas]." Thomas also recorded that she knew that they were women, "from the largeness of their breasts."

Capture and imprisonment

In October 1720, Rackham and his crew were attacked by a sloop captained by Jonathan Barnet under a commission from Nicholas Lawes, Governor of Jamaica. Most of Rackham's pirates put up little resistance, as many of them were too drunk to fight. They were taken to Jamaica where they were convicted and sentenced by Governor Lawes to be hanged. When Anne Bonny was being tried in Jamaica, many of the gentlemen planters of Jamaica knew Anne Bonny’s father and had dealt with him before. Therefore, it was assumed that Bonny may receive favor in her trial. However, her action of leaving was a harrowing circumstance against her that was one of the reasons that ultimately led to her imprisonment. According to Johnson, Bonny's last words to Rackham were: "Had you fought like a man, you need not have been hang'd like a dog".

Read and Bonny both "pleaded their bellies", asking for mercy because they were pregnant, and the court granted them a stay of execution until they gave birth. Read died in prison, most likely from a fever from childbirth. A ledger from a church in Jamaica lists her burial on 28 April 1721, "Mary Read, pirate".

Death
There is no record of Bonny's release, and this has fed speculation as to her fate. A ledger lists the burial of an "Ann Bonny" on 29 December 1733, in the same town in Jamaica where she was tried. Charles Johnson writes in A General History of the Robberies and Murders of the most notorious Pyrates, published in 1724: "She was continued in Prison, to the Time of her lying in, and afterward reprieved from Time to Time; but what is become of her since we cannot tell; only this we know, that she was not executed".

Other sources have stated that she may have returned to the United States after her imprisonment, dying in South Carolina in April 1782.

In popular culture

 The account of Bonny given in A General History of the Pyrates is considered fictional, or only partially correct.
 Bonny is the main character in the 2021 Netflix docuseries The Lost Pirate Kingdom, where she is portrayed by Mia Tomlinson.
 Jean Peters portrays a character based on Anne Bonny in the 1952 film Anne of the Indies. The film is not biographical but helps perpetuate the idea of a beautiful pirate queen.
 Bonny and Read are portrayed in the Detective Conan animated film Detective Conan: Jolly Roger in the Deep Azure.
 Bonny is featured in the video game, Assassin's Creed IV: Black Flag, as a supporting character who becomes quartermaster to protagonist Edward Kenway during the final levels of the game. She is voiced by actress Sarah Greene.
 Bonny is a playable character in Fate/Grand Order as a Rider-class and an Archer-class Servant along with Read; Bonny is voiced by Ayako Kawasumi.
 Bonny is a main character in the Starz series Black Sails and is portrayed by Clara Paget.
 Read (Cara Roberts) introduces herself to Bonny under the name of Mark Read in the final episode of Black Sails.
 Bonny is featured in the song "The Ballad of Mary Read and Anne Bonny" by the Baja Brigade.
 The second song from the Death Grips album Government Plates is named "Anne Bonny".
 Bonny is depicted as a pirate lord having founded Libertalia alongside Henry Avery, Thomas Tew, and several other famous pirates in Uncharted 4: A Thief's End in an altered version of the pirate colony's founding. Her corpse is encountered at a certain point in the game.
 Bonny and Mary Read are mentioned in Charlie Kaufman's 2020 novel Antkind.
 In the manga One Piece, the character Jewelry Bonney is named after Anne Bonny.
 Anne Bonny is a prominent character in the German animated film The Abrafaxe – Under The Black Flag.
 The 1948 film The Spanish Main includes the character Anne Bonny in a fictionalised account.
 Captain Anne Bonny is portrayed by Hillary Brooke in the 1952 comedy film Abbott and Costello Meet Captain Kidd. She initially teams up with Captain Kidd in search of a treasure but is ultimately betrayed by him.
 A character named Anne Bonnie appears as a supporting antagonist in the 2021 anime series Fena: Pirate Princess. She is depicted as a member of the all-female pirate crew of the ship Rumble Rose, serving under captain Grace O'Malley. Another character named after Mary Read is one of her crewmates.
 A character named Anne Bonny appears in the Cyberpunk Red podcast Dark Future Dice from Rocket Adrift Games. She is depicted as a bunny nomad racer.
 A character named Anne Bonnie appears as a ghost in a 1974 episode of CBS Radio Mystery Theatre called "The Strange Voyage Of The Lady Dee".
 Bonny is the subject of the 2018 song "Anne Bonny" by Karliene.
 Anne Bonny, along with John Rackham and Mary Read, features in the AMA Theatre stage play The Buccaneers and is played by Annie Albici
 Anne Bonny and Mary Read appear in the Lyrics of the song “5 Guns West” by Adam and the Ants, on their 3rd album Prince Charming (released in November 1981)

Statue
In 2020, a statue of Bonny and Read was unveiled at Execution Dock in Wapping, London. It is planned to eventually bring the statue to Burgh Island in south Devon.

See also
 Capture of the sloop William

Notes

References
Websites
 "Anne Bonny", Encyclopædia Britannica Online
 "Fact and Fiction", Newspaper article
 "The true and false stories of Anne Bonny, pirate woman of the Caribbean", Newspaper article
Books
 Details the trials of Jack Rackam, Mary Read, Anne Bonny, and Charles Vane.
 
 Cordingly, David. "Bonny, Anne (1698–1782)", Oxford Dictionary of National Biography, Oxford University Press, 2004. Accessed 18 November 2006.
 
 
Jarrells, Ralph E. (2019). "Fiery Red Hair, Emerald Green Eyes and A Vicious Irish Temper", WordCrafts Press. 2019. 
 
 
 
 
 Simon, Rebecca Alexandra (2022). Pirate Queens: The Lives of Anne Bonny and Mary Read''. Philadelphia: Pen & Sword Books Ltd.
 
 
Games
 Assassin's Creed IV: Black Flag fictionalized version of Anne Bonny voiced by Sarah Greene

External links

Year of birth uncertain
Year of death uncertain
18th-century pirates
18th-century Irish people
18th-century American people
18th-century American women
Female-to-male cross-dressers
Irish female pirates
Kingdom of Ireland emigrants to the Thirteen Colonies
People from Kinsale
People from Charleston, South Carolina
South Carolina colonial people
1697 births